The Agua Negra Pass (Spanish: Paso de Agua Negra) is a pass over the Andes mountains which connects Argentina and Chile. The highest point of this pass is at  AMSL.

Agua Negra Tunnel
To improve trade between Chile and Argentina, a 14 km, three-bore vehicular tunnel (two for traffic and one for ventilation) below the pass is planned, which will allow year-round traffic. (The pass is closed for much of the winter.)

In March 2015, Argentina officially approved the project.  It is awaiting ratification from Chile.

In 2018, the bidding contest for the tunnel project between construction companies took place. The whole project was budgeted at 1.5 billion dollars.

Also planned for the deepest part of the tunnel is the Agua Negra Deep Experiment Site (ANDES) (ANDES): an underground laboratory.  Because all currently operating deep underground laboratories are located in the Northern Hemisphere, a Southern Hemisphere site would have some unique benefits:
 Combined with existing neutrino detectors, a longer baseline would allow more accurate localization of sources in neutrino astronomy, and
 When searching for dark matter, there is expected to be a seasonal variation due to the Earth's motion around the Sun.  But such a signal could also be an error, caused by some subtle seasonal effect.  Confirmation from a location with opposite seasons would rule out such an error.
ANDES is not expected to be ready before 2027.

Gallery

See also 

Elqui Province, Chile
San Juan Province, Argentina

References 

Argentina–Chile border crossings
Mountain passes of Chile
Mountain passes of Argentina
Mountain passes of the Andes
Landforms of Atacama Region
Landforms of Catamarca Province